Hylaeus panamensis is a species of hymenopteran in the family Colletidae. It is found in Central America and North America.

References

Further reading

 

Colletidae
Articles created by Qbugbot
Insects described in 1954